Carl Sferrazza Anthony is an author and commentator in the United States. He has written several books on American First Ladies. He was a speechwriter for Nancy Reagan. He was the historian for the National First Ladies' Library and has made dozens of appearances on C-SPAN. He lives in California and has also written screenplays.

He was a contributing editor at George and a producer for the television movies Reagans (2003). He has written for several publications and his books have been reviewed in various magazines and periodicals.

Bibliography
First Ladies: The Saga of the Presidents' Wives and Their Power published by William Morrow, New York, New York Volume 1: 1789–1961 (1990) Volume 2: 1961–1990 (1991)
America's Most Influential First Ladies, Oliver Press in Minneapolis, Minnesota (1992) 
As We Remember Her: Jacqueline Kennedy Onassis, in the Words of Her Family and Friends, HarperCollins in New York, New York (1997)
Florence Harding: The First Lady, the Jazz Age, and the Death of America's Most Scandalous President,  William Morrow in New York, New York (1998)
America's First Families: An Inside View of Two Hundred Years of Private Life in the White House, Touchstone in New York, New York (2000)
The Kennedy White House: Family Life and Pictures, 1961–1963, Simon & Schuster in New York (2001)
Heads of State, Bloomsbury in New York (2004)
Nellie Taft: The Unconventional First Lady of the Ragtime Era, William Morrow in New York (2005)
Edith Wilson: The First, First Lady President

References

External links

21st-century American historians
20th-century American historians
American male non-fiction writers
21st-century American male writers
20th-century American male writers
21st-century American biographers
Year of birth missing (living people)
Living people